Prayer in the Mosque is a mid-19th century painting by French artist Jean-Léon Gérôme. Done in oil on canvas, the painting depicts the interior of an Egyptian mosque in which worshipers are praying. The orientalist painting is in the collection of the Metropolitan Museum of Art.

References

1871 paintings
Paintings by Jean-Léon Gérôme
Paintings in the collection of the Metropolitan Museum of Art